The 2016 Coventry City Council election was scheduled to take place on 5 May 2016 to elect members of Coventry City Council in England. This was on the same day as other local elections.

Current Council seats 
The table below shows a summary of the make-up of the City Council before the 5 May 2016 elections.

Number of candidates by party

Election result in 2016

Ward results

Bablake

Binley and Willenhall

Cheylesmore

Earlsdon

Foleshill

Henley

Holbrook

Longford

Lower Stoke

Radford

Sherbourne

St Michael's

Upper Stoke

Wainbody

Westwood

Whoberley

Woodlands

Wyken

References

2016 English local elections
2016
2010s in Coventry